Crown Prince Soulivong Savang (born 8 May 1963), grandson of the last King of Laos Savang Vatthana, is the pretender to the Lao throne. Laos was a monarchy until 1975, when the communist Pathet Lao seized control of the nation, causing Savang Vatthana to abdicate his throne.  Soulivong Savang lives in exile in Paris.

Biography 
Soulivong Khantharinh was born on 8 May 1963 at the Royal Palace in Luang Prabang to Crown Prince Vong Savang and Crown Princess Mahneelai of the Kingdom of Laos.

After the communist revolution, some members of the royal family were placed in re-education camps where they reportedly died, although Prince Souphanouvong later became President of the newly established republic. Prince Khantharinh escaped from captivity in Laos with his younger brother Prince Thayavong Savang in 1981, arriving in France as refugees.

Education

Soulivong Savang attended the University of Clermont-Ferrand in France and also obtained a law degree.

Political aspirations

He has been working to restore democracy as well as "social and charitable reforms" to Laos. "The restoration of the monarchy would be up to the Lao people", he said. His uncle Prince Sauryavong Savang was regarded as head of the Laotian royal family and acted as regent to his nephew. A Royal Lao Government in Exile exists.

On 19 September 1997, Soulivong Khantharinh and his Uncle Prince Sauryavong Khantharinh initiated a Royal Lao Conference in Seattle, United States. Over five hundred Lao exiles and representatives of the Hmong, Kmu, Mien, Thaidam and all ethnic minority community attended. This conference established the Lao Representative Abroad Council.

On 19 September 1999, a second conference was held in Montreal, Canada, to follow up the progress of LRAC work and focus on non-profit organizations to support the local and worldwide community through community development, social services, education and job development, promoting cultural activity. Soulivong capitalized on the rise in royalist sentiment in neighboring Thailand.

The Laotian exile community – 100,000 in France, 40,000 in Australia and half a million in the United States – has been fractured ethnically between Lao and Hmong. The crown prince said he tells both groups that a constitutional monarchy is their best hope of unity.

Private life
On 10 November 2007, the Prince married Princess Chansouk Soukthala. The ceremony, which took place in Canada, was attended by 800 guests. The bride, Princess Chansouk, is a daughter of the former military Prosecutor Prince Tanh Soukthala and Princess Bounchanh Soukthala.

Ancestry

See also
Lao royal family
Prince Souvanna Phouma
Prince Phetsarath Rattanavongsa
Pathet Lao
Prince Souphanouvong

References

External links
Exiled Laos Prince Appeals to US by Washington Post
Former Royal Laos Flag & Laos National Anthem
Speech of His Royal Highness Prince Soulivong Savang at Bowdoin College
Political turmoil comes to one of the most isolated communist ruled countries in Southeast Asia
Press release of the Lao Royal Family
LAOS: ROYALTY Kingdom Come?
Deposed Lao family adds royal touch to Farmington temple; Families gather for day of worship and remembrance
Laos Royals pay respects to September 11, 2001 Victims (Photos)
Welcoming speech of Crown Prince Soulivong Savang (French)

 

1963 births
Living people
Heirs apparent who never acceded
Laotian royalty
Pretenders to the Laotian throne
Laotian exiles
Laotian anti-communists